The NC-4 is a Curtiss NC flying boat that was the first aircraft to fly across the Atlantic Ocean, albeit not non-stop. The NC designation was derived from the collaborative efforts of the Navy (N) and Curtiss (C). The NC series flying boats were designed to meet wartime needs, and after the end of World War I they were sent overseas to validate the design concept.

The aircraft was designed by Glenn Curtiss and his team, and manufactured by Curtiss Aeroplane and Motor Company, with the hull built by the Herreshoff Manufacturing Corporation in Bristol, Rhode Island.

In May 1919, a crew of United States Navy and US Coast Guard aviators flew the NC-4 from New York State to Lisbon, Portugal, over the course of 19 days. This included time for stops for numerous repairs and  crewmen's rest, with stops along the way in Massachusetts, Nova Scotia (on the mainland), Newfoundland, and twice in the Azores Islands. Then its flight from the Azores to Lisbon completed the first transatlantic flight between North America and Europe, and two more flights from Lisbon to northwestern Spain to Plymouth, England, completed the first flight between North America and Great Britain. This accomplishment was somewhat eclipsed in the minds of the public by the first nonstop transatlantic flight, made by the Royal Air Force pilots John Alcock and Arthur Whitten Brown two weeks later.

Background

The transatlantic capability of the NC-4 was the result of developments in aviation that began before World War I. In 1908, Glenn Curtiss had experimented unsuccessfully with floats on the airframe of an early June Bug craft, but his first successful takeoff from water was not carried out until 1911, with an A-1 airplane fitted with a central pontoon. In January 1912, he first flew his first hulled "hydro-aeroplane", which led to an introduction with the retired English naval officer John Cyril Porte who was looking for a partner to produce an aircraft with him to attempt win the prize of the newspaper the Daily Mail for the first transatlantic flight between the British Isles and North America – not necessarily nonstop, but using just one airplane. (e.g. changing airplanes in Iceland or the Azores was not allowed.)

Emmitt Clayton Bedell, a chief designer for Curtiss, improved the hull by incorporating the Bedell Step, the innovative hydroplane "step" in the hull allowed for breaking clear of the water at takeoff. Porte and Curtiss were joined by Lt. John H. Towers of the U.S. Navy as a test pilot. The 1914 America flying boat produced by Porte and Curtiss was a larger aircraft with two engines and two pusher propellers. The members of the team hoped to claim the prize for a transatlantic flight, however their ambitions were curtailed on 4 August 1914 with the outbreak of World War I in Europe.

Development continued in the U.S. and Porte now back in the Royal Navy's flight arm the RNAS, commissioned more flying boats to be built by the Curtiss Company. These could be used for long-range antisubmarine warfare patrols. Porte modified these aircraft, and he developed them into his own set of Felixstowe flying boats with more powerful engines, longer ranges, better hulls and better handling characteristics. He shared this design with the Curtiss Company, which built these improved models under license, selling them to the U.S. Government.

This culminated in a set of four identical aircraft, the NC-1, NC-2, NC-3 and the NC-4, the U.S. Navy's first series of four medium-sized Curtiss NC floatplanes made for the Navy by the Curtiss Aeroplane and Motor Company. The NC-4 made its first test flight on 30 April 1919.

World War I had ended in November 1918, before the completion of the four Curtiss NCs. Then in 1919, with several of the new floatplanes in its possession, the officers in charge of the U.S. Navy decided to demonstrate the capability of the seaplanes with a transatlantic flight. However it was necessary to schedule refueling and repair stops that were also for crewmen's meals and sleep and rest breaks – since these Curtiss NCs were quite slow in flight. For example, the flight between Newfoundland and the Azores required many hours of night flight because it could not be completed in one day.

The transatlantic flight

The U.S. Navy's transatlantic flight expedition began on 8 May 1919. The NC-4 started out in the company of two other Curtiss NCs, the NC-1 and the NC-3 (with the NC-2 having been cannibalized for spare parts to repair the NC-1 before this group of planes had even left New York City). The three aircraft left from Naval Air Station Rockaway, with intermediate stops at the Chatham Naval Air Station, Massachusetts, and Halifax, Nova Scotia, before flying on to Trepassey, Newfoundland, on 15 May. Eight U.S. Navy warships were stationed along the northern East Coast of the United States and Atlantic Canada to help the Curtiss NCs in navigation and to rescue their crewmen in case of any emergency.

The "base ship", or the flagship for all of the Navy ships that had been assigned to support the flight of the Curtiss NCs, was the former minelayer , which the Navy had converted into a seaplane tender just before the flight of the Curtiss NCs. With a displacement of just over 3,000 tons, Aroostook was larger than the Navy's destroyers that had been assigned to support the transatlantic flight in 1919. Before the Curtiss NCs took off from New York City, Aroostook had been sent to Trepassey, Newfoundland, to await their arrival there, and then provide refueling, relubrication, and maintenance work on the NC-1, NC-3 and NC-4. Next, she steamed across the Atlantic meet the group when they arrived in England.

On 16 May, the three Curtiss NCs departed on the longest leg of their journey, from Newfoundland to the Azores Islands in the mid-Atlantic. Twenty-two more Navy ships, mostly destroyers, were stationed at about  spacings along this route. These "station ships" were brightly illuminated during the nighttime. Their sailors blazed their searchlights into the sky, and they also fired bright star shells into the sky to help the aviators to stay on their planned flight path.

It had taken the crewmen 15 hours, 18 minutes, to fly this leg. The NCs encountered thick fog banks along the route. Both the NC-1 and the NC-3 were forced to land on the open Atlantic Ocean because the poor visibility and loss of a visual horizon made flying extremely dangerous. NC-1 was damaged landing in the rough seas and could not become airborne again. NC-3 had mechanical problems.

The crewmen of the NC-1, including future Admiral Marc Mitscher, were rescued by the Greek cargo ship SS Ionia. This ship took the NC-1 in tow, but it sank three days later and was lost in deep water.

After several days of delays for spare parts and repairs, the NC-4 took off again on 27 May. Once again there were station ships of the Navy to help with navigation, especially at night. There were 13 warships arranged along the route between the Azores and Lisbon. The NC-4 had no more serious problems, and it landed in Lisbon harbor after a flight of nine hours, 43 minutes. Thus, the NC-4 become the first aircraft of any kind to fly across the Atlantic Ocean – or any of the other oceans. By flying from Massachusetts and Halifax to Lisbon, the NC-4 also flew from mainland-to-mainland of North America and Europe. Note: the seaplanes were hauled ashore for maintenance work on their engines.

The part of this flight just from Newfoundland to Lisbon had taken a total time 10 days and 22 hours, but with the actual flight time totaling just 26 hours and 46 minutes.

The "NC-4" later flew on to England, arriving in Plymouth on 31 May to great fanfare, having taken 23 days for the flight from Newfoundland to Great Britain. For the final flight legs – from Lisbon to Ferrol, Spain, and then from Ferrol to Plymouth – 10 more U.S. Navy warships were stationed along the route. A total of 53 U.S. Navy ships had been stationed along the route from New York City to Plymouth.

Most of the flight route taken by the NC-4 was indicated on the map of the North Atlantic published by Flight magazine on 29 May 1919, while the NC-4 was still on the mainland of Portugal.

The feat of making the first transatlantic flight was somewhat eclipsed shortly afterwards by the first nonstop transatlantic flight by John Alcock and Arthur Whitten Brown in a Vickers Vimy biplane, when they flew from Newfoundland to Ireland nonstop on 14–15 June 1919, in 16 hours and 27 minutes. Consequently, Alcock and Brown won a prize of £10,000 offered by the newspaper, Daily Mail, which had been first announced in 1913, and then renewed in 1918, to "the aviator who shall first cross the Atlantic in an aeroplane in flight from any point in the United States, Canada, or Newfoundland to any point in Great Britain or Ireland, in 72 consecutive hours." The conditions also stipulated that "only one aircraft may be used for each attempt." Hence, there was no possibility of changing to a fresh aircraft in Iceland, Greenland, the Azores, and beyond.

Alcock and Brown also made their flight nonstop, even though this was not specified in the rules given by the Daily Mail. Conceivably, any aviators could have made stops on Iceland, Greenland, or the Azores along the way for refueling, as long as they completed the entire flight within 72 hours. The rule that "only one aircraft may be used" eliminated the possibility of having fresh aircraft, with their fuel tanks already topped off, and new oil in their crankcase(s), waiting for the pilot or pilots to change from one exhausted airplane to a fresh one.

The Curtiss NCs were never entered into the above competition – because the U.S. Navy never planned for their flight to be completed in fewer than 72 hours.

The crewmen on the NC-4

The crewmen of the NC-4 were Albert Cushing Read, the commander and navigator; Walter Hinton and Elmer Fowler Stone (Coast Guard Aviator #1), the two pilots; James L. Breese and Eugene S. Rhoads, the two flight engineers; and Herbert C. Rodd, the radio operator. Earlier, E.H. Howard had been chosen to go as one of the flight engineers, but on 2 May, Howard lost a hand in misjudging his distance from a whirling propeller. Consequently, he was replaced by Rhoads in the crew.

After the crossing

After arriving at Plymouth, England, the crewmen of the NC-4, who had been reunited with the crewmen of the less-successful NC-1 and NC-3, went by train to London, and there they received a tumultuous welcome. Next, they visited Paris, France, to be lionized again.

The NC-4 was dismantled in Plymouth, and then loaded onto , the base ship for the Curtiss NC's transatlantic flight, 
 for the return journey to the United States. Aroostook arriving in New York Harbor on 2 July 1919.

Following the return of all three of the aircrews on board the ocean liner , a goodwill tour of the East Coast of the United States and the Gulf Coast of the Southern States was carried out by the aircrew.

On 9 February 1929, Congress passed Public Law 70-714 (45 Stat. 1157), awarding Congressional Gold Medals to Lt. Commander John H. Towers for "conceiving, organizing, and commanding the first trans-Atlantic flight", and the six men of the flight crew "for their extraordinary achievement in making the first successful trans-Atlantic flight, in the United States naval flying boat NC-4, in May 1919." The Navy created a military decoration known as the NC-4 Medal.

It is very rare that a Congressional Gold Medal in miniature form be authorized for wear on a naval or military uniform.

The NC-4 is property of the Smithsonian Institution, since it was given to that institution by the Navy after its return home. However, this aircraft was too large to be housed in either the older Smithsonian Arts & Industries Building in Washington, D.C., or in its successor, the 1976-completed National Air and Space Museum main building, also in Washington. A smaller model of the NC-4 is kept in the Milestones of Flight Gallery in the National Air and Space Museum, a place of honor, along with the original Wright Flyer of 1903; Charles Lindbergh's Spirit of St. Louis of 1927; Chuck Yeager's Glamorous Glennis X-1 rocket plane of 1947, and an X-15 rocket aircraft. As of 1974, the reassembled NC-4 is on loan from the Smithsonian to the National Museum of Naval Aviation in Pensacola, Florida.

Operators
 
United States Navy

Specifications (NC-4)

Notable appearances in media
Frederick Ellsworth Bigelow (1873–1929), famous for the "Our Director March", wrote a march called "The NC4" dedicated to the men of the NC4.

See also
Charles M. Olmsted

References

Notes

Citations

Bibliography

 Nevin, David. The Pathfinders (The Epic of Flight series). Alexandria, Virginia: Time Life Books, 1980. .
 Silberg, Eric and Haas, David. Developing the Navy’s NC Flying Boats: Transforming Aeronautical Engineering for the First Transatlantic Flight. American Institute of Aeronautics and Astronautics, 2011. 
 Smith, Richard K. First Across: The U.S. Navy's Transatlantic Fight of 1919.  Annapolis, Maryland: Naval Institute Press, 1973. .
 Turnbull, Archibald D., Captain, USNR and Clifford L. Lord, Lt. Commander, USNR. History of United States Naval Aviation. New Haven, Connecticut: Yale University Press, 1949.
 Vance, Jonathan. High Flight. Toronto, Ontario: Penguin of Canada, 2002. .

External links

First flight across the Atlantic
Forgotten Flyers of 1919
NC-4 on Naval Aviation Museum site
Albert C. Read and the NC-4 on Early Aviators site, with good photographs
Navy-Curtiss NC-4 Flying Boat on aviation-history.com
History Detectives . Investigations – NC-4: First Across the Atlantic – PBS
 
Navy-Curtiss NC-4 Flying Boat on Small Boat Restoration
 

Congressional Gold Medal recipients
Rockaway, Queens
United States Coast Guard Aviation
Articles containing video clips
Individual aircraft
Transatlantic flight